Retrotransposon Gag like 3 is a protein that in humans is encoded by the RTL3 gene.

Function

This gene is a member of a family of gag-related retrotransposon genes. These genes appear to have lost the ability to retrotranspose; however, their open reading frames have remained intact, which may indicate that these genes have acquired new functions in the cell.

References

Further reading